Grozny is the capital city of the Chechen Republic, Russia.

Grozny (masculine), Groznaya (feminine), or Groznoye (neuter) may also refer to:
Ivan the Terrible (Grozny) (1530–1584), Grand Prince of Moscow (1533–1547) and the Tsar of Russia (1547–1584)
Grozny Group, a volcano on the Kuril Islands, Russia
Grozny Urban Okrug, a municipal formation which the city of republic significance of Grozny in the Chechen Republic, Russia is incorporated as
Grozny (inhabited locality) (Groznaya, Groznoye), several inhabited localities in Russia
Groznoye, former name of Amanbaev, a village in Kyrgyzstan
Soviet destroyer Grozny (1936), a Gnevny-class destroyer
Grozny (horse), a Peruvian racehorse